Labbra serrate is a 1942 Italian drama film directed by Mario Mattoli and starring Annette Bach.

Cast
 Annette Bach - La contessa Lydia Lamsky
 Andrea Checchi - Carlo Massani
 Fosco Giachetti - Ruggero D'Anzi
 Vera Carmi - Anna Massani
 Giulio Donadio - Il giudice Massani
 Carlo Campanini - Camillo Pardini
 Tino Scotti - Francesco Ugoletti
 Armida Bonocore - Laura Croci / Antonietta Marradi (as Oliva Egli)
 Nino Pavese - Il direttore del carcere
 Armando Migliari - Il commissario

References

External links

1942 films
1942 drama films
1940s Italian-language films
Italian black-and-white films
Films directed by Mario Mattoli
Italian drama films
1940s Italian films